Osiedle Sienkiewicza is one of the districts of the Polish city of Białystok. It is one of the smaller districts in terms of the area but is relatively densely populated. The district lies directly north to the city centre on the right bank of the Biala river (with the exception of a small segment of Pilsudski alley, which lies on the left bank). It is named after Henryk Sienkiewicz, whose statue can be found in the district.

The area comprises what used to be the northern part of the Jewish ghetto created by Nazi German occupying forces during World War II. On 20 August 1943 the ghetto was pacified, which resulted in a total destruction of the area - less than 20 buildings from before that period have survived until now.

After the World War II finished, the area was redeveloped and now consists of urban greenery, public buildings and a housing estate. The latter consists mainly of four- and eleven-storey blocks of flats administered by one housing association - Bialostocka Spoldzielnia Mieszkaniowa (BSM). There are also several buildings owned by other associations as well as private proprietors.

On 9 March 1989 a train carrying chlorine was derailed on the railway bordering the district. If the chlorine tanks had opened much of the population of the city would have been killed, but the emergency was successfully dealt with by fire brigade. This event is commemorated by a statue standing on Poleska street where the accident took place.

External links 

Districts of Białystok
Holocaust locations in Poland